The Federation of Uganda Football Associations (FUFA) is the governing body of association football in Uganda.  The association was founded in 1924, became affiliated with FIFA in 1960 and the Confederation of African Football (CAF) in 1961. In 1973, FUFA went ahead and got affiliated with CECAFA. Further more, FUFA is also affiliated to Uganda Olympic Committee.

FUFA is;

 a custodian of eight men's and women's national football teams (i.e. the Uganda Cranes, the Crested Cranes, U-23; Uganda Kobs, U-20; Uganda Hippos, U-17; Uganda Cubs, Sand Cranes, U-20 girls and U-17 girls) 
 a top administrator/regulator of national football league which runs from the first tier (top/1st division) to the fifth tier (5th division). The first division is the Uganda Premier League also known as the StarTimes Uganda Premier League. The 2nd division is the FUFA Big League.  The third tier (Regional Leagues) is organised by the regional football associations (RFA) which are 8 in total (Kampala RFA, Buganda RFA, Western RFA, Kitara RFA, Eastern RFA, Northern RFA, West Nile RFA and North East RFA)  and the fourth tier (District Leagues / Fourth Division) is organised by district football associations (DFA). 
 FUFA also organizes the football tournaments; that is to say, Uganda Cup, which is the oldest football competition of knockout format in Uganda having started in 1971. The FUFA Drum which is an inter-provinces (Kampala, Buganda, Ankole, Kigezi, Teso, Tooro, Bunyoro, Rwenzori, West Nile, Busoga, Sebei, Bugisu, Karamoja, Lango, Acholi and Bukedi) tournament is also another tournament run and organised by FUFA. Last but not least, the Odilo tournament which runs across the country. is a Primary schools championship which is also organised by this federation.

History

In 1924, the Kampala Football Association (KFA) was formed and in the 1950s became the Uganda Football Association (UFA). In 1967 the Uganda Football Association (UFA) was changed to the Federation of Uganda Football Associations (FUFA).

Administration
FUFA is an association made up of 31 member associations and represented by 86 delegates at the Supreme Body
called the FUFA General Assembly (GA). The member associations include:
 Uganda Beach Soccer Association (UBSA)
 Uganda Futsal Association (UFA)
 Uganda Schools Football Association (USFA)
 Uganda Youth Football Association (UYFA)
 Uganda Youth Soccer Academy (UYSA)
 Uganda Women's Football Association (UWFA)
 and the 8 regional football associations (see section below)
The organisation is led by the FUFA Executive Committee (EXCOM) which is advised and supported by the FUFA Standing Committees, Judicial Bodies and Secretariat.

Presidents

Previous
Previous presidents are as follows:

 1924-34 - King Sir Daudi Chwa
 1935-44 – W.A. Hunter
 1945-53 – W.B. Ouseley
 1954-56 – Eriasafu Nsobya
 1957-62 – W.W. Kulubya
 1963-64 – George Magezi
 1965-68 – A.A.A Nekyon
 1969-71 – H. Blamaze Lwanga
 1972-74 – Kezekia Ssegwanga Musisi
 1974-76 – Era Mugisa
 1977-79 – Capt. Muhammed Sseruwagi
 1979-80 – Gerald Sendawula
 1981 – Steven Ibale
 1982 – Peter Abe
 1982-83 – Careb Babihuga
 1983-85 – Geresom Kagurusi
 1985 – Chris Rwanika
 1985-87 – Barnabas Byabazaire
 1988-89 – Paul Katamba Lujjo
 1989-92 – J.B. Semanobe
 1992 – John Ssebaana Kizito (May – December)
 1994 – Ben Kurt Omoding
 1994-95 – Brigadier Moses Ali
 1995-98 – Twaha Kakaire
 1998-2004 – Denis Obua
 2004-13 – Lawrence Mulindwa
 2013–present - Moses Magogo Hassim

Current
The president of FUFA is Moses Hassim Magogo who succeeded Lawrence Mulindwa in August 2013. Magogo is an electrical engineer by trade and has worked for the African Development Bank. Magogo was previously the Federation's vice president, in charge of administration.

In 2000, while playing for Kinyara FC, Magogo started to actively participate in sports talk shows on radio. That platform endeared him to the public and by the time he was elected the FUFA delegate for Lubaga, Magogo had created a niche as one of the most knowledgeable persons about football management. FUFA subsequently appointed him to run the Super League.

Magogo is accredited for having transformed the league and football competition systems in Uganda and particularly the FUFA Big League and Regional Leagues. He is also responsible for starting the players contracting regulations and system in Uganda, negotiating and concluding the various sponsorships to football. With an assertive nature he has been a central figure in administration wrangles.

Regional organisations
Eight regional football associations administer the Regional Leagues covering the third tier of Ugandan football.  Affiliated members includes Regional League clubs, schools football associations and cup competitions.

 Buganda Region Football Association (4 zones)
 Kampala Region Football Association (1 zone)
 Eastern Region Football Association (2 zones)
 Northern Region Football Association (1 zone)

 West Nile Region Football Association (1 zone)
 Western Region Football Association (1 zone)
 Kitara Region Football Association (2 zones)
 North East Region Football Association (1 zone)

Zones and district organisations
Below the regional football associations, FUFA has divided the country into 13 administrative zones, each of which encompass several district football associations.  These local associations are affiliated to FUFA and manage grassroots affairs in their districts including the Fourth Division Leagues.

North Eastern region - Zone 1
Teso & Karamoja Sub Region
 Amuria District Football Association
 Bukedea District Football Association
 Kaberamaido District Football Association
 Katakwi District Football Association
 Kumi District Football Association
 Moroto District Football Association
 Napak District Football Association
 Ngora District Football Association
 Serere District Football Association
 Soroti District Football Association

Eastern region - Zone 2
Sebei, Bugisu & Bukeddi Sub Region
 Budaka District Football Association
 Busia District Football Association
 Butalejja District Football Association
 Kibuku District Football Association
 Mbale District Football Association
 Sironko District Football Association
 Tororo District Football Association

Mid North region – Zone 3
Acholi & Lango Sub Region
 Amuru District Football Association
 Apac District Football Association
 Dokolo District Football Association
 Gulu District Football Association
 Kitgum District Football Association
 Lira District Football Association
 Nwoya District Football Association
 Otuke District Football Association
 Oyam District Football Association
 Pader District Football Association

West Nile region - Zone 4
West Nile Sub Region
 Adjumani District Football Association
 Arua District Football Association
 Koboko District Football Association
 Moyo District Football Association
 Nebbi District Football Association
 Yumbe District Football Association

Kitara region – Zone 5
Bunyoro Sub Region
 Hoima District Football Association
 Kiryandongo District Football Association
 Masindi District Football Association

Western region – Zone 6
Ankole & Kigezi Sub Region
 Bushenyi District Football Association
 Isingiro District Football Association
 Kabale District Football Association
 Kanungu District Football Association
 Kiruhura District Football Association
 Kisoro District Football Association
 Mbarara District Football Association
 Ntungamo District Football Association

Buganda region – Zone 7
Southern Buganda Sub Region
 Lwengo District Football Association
 Lyantonde District Football Association
 Masaka District Football Association
 Rakai District Football Association
 Sembabule District Football Association

Buganda region – Zone 8
Central and Western Buganda
 Kiboga District Football Association
 Kyankwanzi District Football Association
 Mityana District Football Association
 Mpigi District Football Association
 Mubende District Football Association
 Wakiso District Football Association

Kampala region - Zone 9
Kampala
 Kampala Central District Football Association
 Kawempe District Football Association
 Makindye District Football Association
 Nakawa District Football Association
 Rubaga District Football Association

Eastern region – Zone 10
Busoga Sub Region
 Bugiri District Football Association
 Buyende District Football Association
 Iganga District Football Association
 Jinja District Football Association
 Kaliro District Football Association
 Kamuli District Football Association
 Mayuge District Football Association
 Namayingo District Football Association
 Namutumba District Football Association

Kitara region – Zone 11
Tooro Sub Region
 Bundibugyo District Football Association
 Kabarole District Football Association
 Kamwenge District Football Association
 Kasese District Football Association
 Kyegegwa District Football Association
 Kyenjojo District Football Association

Buganda region – Zone 12
Northern Buganda Sub Region
 Luwero District Football Association
 Nakaseke District Football Association

Buganda region – Zone 13
Eastern Buganda Sub Region
 Buikwe District Football Association
 Kayunga District Football Association
 Mukono District Football Association

Current administrators and officials

Presidency
 President - Eng. Moses Magogo Hassim
 First vice president - Justus Mugisha
 Second vice president - Darius Mugoye
 Third Vice President - Hon. Florence Nakiwala Kiyingi

Executive Members

 Buganda - Hajji Abdul Lukooya Ssekabira
 Eastern - Magoola Issa Kakaire
 Kampala - Hamid Juma
 Kitara - Rogers Byamukama
 Northern - Mukidi David Kalyebara
 West Nile - Rasoul Ariga
 North East - Richard Ochom
 Western - Chris John Kalibbala
 Women - Agnes Mugena
 Co-opted member - Kalema Ronnie
 Co-opted member - Mulindwa Rogers

Note  The Executive Committee had 15 members:  The FUFA president and his vice presidents and the other 11 members.

Committee chairmen

 FUFA Competitions committee - Hamid Juma
 FUFA National teams committee - Hamid Juma
 FUFA Finance Committee - Rasoul Ariga
 FUFA Legal Committee - Ojok Odur Geoffrey
 FUFA Licensing committee - Mulindwa Rogers
 Marketing and Communication - Rogers Byamukama
 IMOC - Magoola Issa Kakaire
 Member Associations committee - Mukidi David Kalyebala
 Players’ Status committee - Mayor. Richard Ochom
 Referees' standing committee - Kalema Ronnie
 Security & safety committee - Hajji Abdul Lukooya Ssekabira
 Football Development Committee - Kalibbala John Chris
 Women's Football committee - Agnes Mugena
 FUFA electoral Committee - Bwiire Mathias

See also 
Ugandan Premier League

Confederation of African Football

References

External links
 
 Uganda at the FIFA website.
  Uganda at CAF Online
   Uganda At Facebook

Uganda
Football in Uganda
Sports organizations established in 1924
1924 establishments in Africa